José de León Toral (December 23, 1900 – February 9, 1929) was a Roman Catholic who assassinated General Álvaro Obregón, then-president elect of Mexico, in 1928.

Early life

León Toral was born in Matehuala, San Luis Potosí, into a family of Catholic miners. He moved to Mexico City during the Mexican Revolution and witnessed General Obregón closing churches and arresting priests who were suspected of supporting ex-President Victoriano Huerta. In 1920, he joined the National League for the Defense of Religious Freedom, which opposed the governments of Obregón (1920–1924) and Plutarco Elías Calles, and he reportedly was also involved in the Cristero movement.

Background
During the Calles administration, oppression against the Catholic Church greatly expanded in 1926 under the Calles Law, which provided for the execution of priests and other individuals who violated provisions of the 1917 Constitution. Wearing clerical garb in public outside church buildings was punishable by a fine of 500 pesos, then approximately US$250. A priest who criticized the government could be imprisoned for five years with no right to trial by jury.

Some states enacted even more oppressive measures. Chihuahua enacted a law permitting only a single priest to serve all of the state's Catholics. To help enforce the law, Calles seized church property; expelled all foreign priests; and closed the monasteries, convents, and religious schools.

Obregón had been more lenient to Catholics during his time in office, but the Cristeros and almost everyone else believed that Calles was merely his puppet leader. In 1927, two of León Toral's friends, Humberto and Miguel Pro, were executed after they had falsely been accused of plotting to assassinate Obregón. Incited by a Catholic nun, Concepción Acevedo de la Llata, also known as 'Madre Conchita' or Mother Conchita, he decided to assassinate Obregón, whom he blamed for the government's severities against Catholics.

Assassination

On 17 July 1928, two weeks after Obregón had been re-elected as president, León Toral, a sketch artist, entered La Bombilla restaurant in San Ángel, where a party honoring Obregón was under way. Disguised as a caricaturist, he drew caricatures of Obregón, the orchestra director, and Aarón Sáenz, and showed them to Obregón, who told him the caricatures were well done and suggested that he should continue. When Obregón turned to sit down, León Toral drew a gun and shot him five or six times in the back, killing him instantly.

León Toral was arrested immediately and pleaded guilty, claiming that he killed Obregón to facilitate the establishment of the Kingdom of Christ. Mother Conchita was also arrested and received a 20-year prison sentence but was pardoned after serving 13 years; she eventually married Carlos Castro Balda, a bomber of the Mexican Chamber of Deputies.

Execution 

José de León Toral was sentenced to death and executed by firing squad on Saturday, February 9, 1929 in the Palacio de Lecumberri. His last words were ¡Viva Cristo Rey! (Long Live Christ the King!), the battle cry of the Cristeros. He was buried in the Spanish Pantheon.

Conspiracy theory 
The Mexican historian Rius Facius rediscovered the testimony of the inspection of Obregón's corpse carried out by a doctor. The testimony stated that the body had bullet holes of different calibers, which suggested that more than one weapon was used to assassinate Obregón. This builds up this theory that although José de León Toral undoubtedly fired one weapon, he was not the only one, and there were others as well.

References

1900 births
1929 deaths
Executed Mexican people
People executed by Mexico by firing squad
Mexican Roman Catholics
People executed for murder
People from Matehuala
People of the Mexican Revolution
Mexican assassins
Christ the King
People convicted of murder by Mexico
Mexican people convicted of murder